Anything You Can Do may refer to:
"Anything You Can Do" (Desperate Housewives), an episode of Desperate Housewives
"Anything You Can Do" (I Can Do Better), a song by Irving Berlin
Anything You Can Do (game show), a Canadian game show hosted by Gene Wood
Anything You Can Do (novel), a 1963 science fiction novel by Randall Garrett, writing as Darrel T. Langart